The 2023 Sanfrecce Hiroshima season is their 85th season in existence and their 15th consecutive season in the J1 League. In addition to the league, the club will compete in the Emperor's Cup, J. League Cup, and in the 2023–24 AFC Champions League.

Players

Current squad

Out on loan

Transfers

Competitions

Overall record

Pre-season friendlies

J1 League 

After the club surpassing many fans' expectations with their last season's performances, the club finished in the 3rd place on the 2022 J1 League. Their squad was barely touched significantly, with only a few regulars leaving the team.

League table

Results summary

Results by round

Matches 
The opening match was released by the J.League on 23 December 2022. The full league fixtures were released on 20 January 2023.

Emperor's Cup 

As a J1 League club, it will start in the 2nd round of the competition. In the previous tournament, Sanfrecce reached the final, but lost to Ventforet Kofu on penalty shoot-outs, which resulted in their 12th loss in Emperor's Cup finals, having in total played 15.

J.League Cup 

As every other club, Sanfrecce starts the competition at the group stage. The club will play the season as the defending champions, after they won past Cerezo Osaka in the 2022 J.League Cup Final by a 2–1 win, which was earned with a last-minute comeback.

AFC Champions League

The club will play for the sixth time in the continental competition, which they qualified via their J1 League placement. Their best campaigns at the competitions were Round of 16 exits on 2014 and 2019, being eliminated by Western Sydney Wanderers and Kashima Antlers, respectively. The club will start the competition in the play-off round.

Goalscorers

References

External links 
 Official website 

Sanfrecce Hiroshima seasons
Sanfrecce Hiroshima